Events from the year 1761 in art.

Events
 May 9 – Society of Artists of Great Britain exhibition opens in London. Exhibitors include Gainsborough, Hogarth and Nollekens, and Stubbs shows a painting for the first time (A Stallion Called Romulus).
 Scottish-born artist Allan Ramsay appointed to succeed John Shackelton as Principal Painter in Ordinary to George III of Great Britain.

Works

 François-Hubert Drouais – The children of the comte de Bethune playing the guitar
 Thomas Gainsborough – Portrait of Susannah "Suky" Trevelyan
 William Hogarth – The Five Orders of Perriwigs as they were Worn at the Late Coronation Measured Architectonically (satirical engraving)
 Anton Raphael Mengs
 Parnassus (ceiling fresco for Villa Albani, Rome)
 Portrait of Charles III of Spain
 Joshua Reynolds
 David Garrick Between Tragedy and Comedy
 Georgiana, Countess Spencer, and Her Daughter
 The Ladies Amabel and Mary Jemima Yorke (probable date)
 Louis-François Roubiliac – Memorials to Handel and Lady Elizabeth Nightingale in Westminster Abbey

Births

 January 24 – Johann Christian Reinhart, German painter and etcher (died 1847)
 January 28 – Marguerite Gérard, French painter and etcher (died 1837)
 March – John Laporte, English landscape painter and etcher (died 1839)
 April 10 – Jacques-Edme Dumont, French sculptor (died 1844)
 May 16 – John Opie, Cornish historical and portrait painter (died 1807)
 June 29 – Jacques Kuyper,  Dutch printmaker, painter, draftsman, watercolourist, etcher, musician, and composer (died 1808)
 July 5 – Louis-Léopold Boilly, French painter (died 1845)
 October 11 – Mather Brown, American-born portrait and historical painter (died 1831)
 October 21 – Louis Albert Guislain Bacler d'Albe, French artist, map-maker and close strategic advisor of Napoleon (died 1824)
 September 6 – Marie-Gabrielle Capet, French painter (died 1818)
 November 4 – Bertrand Andrieu, French engraver and medalist (died 1822)
 December 1 – Marie Tussaud, French-born wax modeller of the Madame Tussauds Wax Museum (died 1850)
 date unknown
 Jan Frans Eliaerts, Flemish painter of animals, flowers and fruit (died 1848)
 William Fowler, English artist (died 1832)
 Charles Hayter, English painter (died 1835)
 Sakai Hōitsu, Japanese painter of the Rinpa school (died 1828)
 Zhang Yin, Chinese calligrapher and painter of Qing Dynasty (died 1829)
 probable – Robert Fagan, Irish painter, diplomat and archaeologist (died 1816)

Deaths
 April 4 – Theodore Gardelle, painter and enameller (born 1722) (executed for murder)
 April 30 – Jean Duvivier, French medallist (born 1687)
 July 13 – Claes Lang, Finnish painter (born 1690)
 July 16 – Jacob Fortling, German-Danish sculptor, architect and manufacturer (born 1711)
 July 21 – Louis Galloche, French painter (born 1670)
 August 18 – François Gaspard Adam, French rococo sculptor (born 1710)
 September 7 – Johann Wolfgang Baumgartner, German painter (born 1702)
 December 10 – Johann Georg Platzer, Austrian painter of primarily historical and mythical scenes (born 1704)
 date unknown
 August Querfurt, Austrian painter (born 1696)
 Mary Roberts, miniaturist
 Pieter Tanjé, engraver from the Northern Netherlands (born 1706)
 Ivan Vishnyakov, Russian painter  (born 1699)

References

 
Years of the 18th century in art
1760s in art